Giulio Carlo Argan (17 May 1909 – 12 November 1992) was an Italian art historian, critic and politician.

Biography
Argan was born in Turin and studied in the University of Turin, graduating in 1931. In 1928 he entered the National Fascist Party. In the 1930 he worked for the National Antiquity and Arts Directorate, first in Turin and then in Modena and Rome, where he collaborated to the creation of the Istituto Superiore per la Conservazione ed il Restauro and directed the magazine Le Arti. His career was boosted by the friendship of the Fascist leader Cesare Maria De Vecchi, then national Minister of Education.

After World War II, he taught in universities Palermo and, from 1959, in Rome. Argan  co-founded the publishing house Il Saggiatore and he was a member of the Superior Council of Antiquities and Fine Arts (predecessor of the Ministry of Culture), in which he remained until 1974. In 1968 he published his most famous work, Storia dell'Arte Italiana (History of Italian Art). In 1973 he founded the Rome ISIA, Italy's oldest institution in the field of industrial design.

He was the first Communist mayor of Rome, between 1976 and 1979. He was elected a Foreign Honorary Member of the American Academy of Arts and Sciences in 1992. He died in Rome.

Selected works
 Fra Angelico: Biographical and Critical Study, The Taste of Our Time Vol. 10 (1955) Editions d'Art Albert Skira, Geneva, 127 pp. 
 Studi e note (1955)
 Botticelli: Biographical and Critical Study, The Taste of Our Time Vol. 19 (1957) Editions d'Art Albert Skira, Geneva, 147 pp.
 Salvezza e caduta nell’arte moderna (1964)
 Europe of the Capitals 1600-1700., Art, Ideas, History (1964) Editions d'Art Albert Skira, Geneva, 236 pp.
 Progetto e destino  (1965)
 Storia dell'arte italiana (1968)
 Storia dell’arte come storia della città (1983)
 Da Hogarth a Picasso (1983)
 Forma Naturae (Archetipi & C.) for Antonio Papasso (1983)
 Classico Anticlassico (1984)
 Immagine e persuasione (1986)
 Progetto e oggetto'' (2003)

References

External links
 Italian site about the life and works of Giulio Carlo Argan

1909 births
1992 deaths
Writers from Turin
Italian art historians
Italian publishers (people)
Mayors of Rome
Italian Communist Party politicians
20th-century Italian politicians
Fellows of the American Academy of Arts and Sciences
Members of the Royal Academy of Belgium
20th-century Italian historians
Compasso d'Oro Award recipients